Charles of France might refer to:

King list of the West Francia or France
 Charlemagne (747–814), counted as Charles I, reigned 768–814
 Charles the Bald (823–877), counted as Charles II, reigned 840–877
 Charles the Fat (839–888), counted as Charles III, reigned 884–888
 Charles the Simple (879–929), also counted as Charles III, reigned 893–922
 Charles IV of France (1294–1328), called "the Fair", reigned 1322–1328
 Charles V of France (1338–1380), called "the Wise", reigned 1364–1380
 Charles VI of France (1368–1422), called "the Beloved" and "the Mad", reigned 1380–1422
 Charles VII of France (1403–1461), called "the Victorious" or "the Well-Served", reigned 1422–1461
 Charles VIII of France (1470–1498), called "the Affable", reigned over France 1483–1498 and was de facto King of Naples for five months in 1495, prompting the Italian Wars.
 Charles IX of France (1550–1574), reigned 1560–1574
 Charles X of France (1757–1836), reigned 1824–1830

Other princes 
 Charles, Duke of Lower Lorraine (953–993), son of Louis IV of France
 Charles I of Naples (1226–1285), posthumous son of Louis VIII of France, King of Naples as Charles of Anjou, by conquest and by papal grant
 Charles, Count of Valois (1270–1325), son of Philip III of France
 Charles of France (born and died 1386), son of Charles VI of France
 Charles of France (1392–1401), son of Charles VI of France
 Charles de Valois, Duc de Berry (1446–1472), son of Charles VII of France
 Charles-Orland of France (1492–1495), son of Charles VIII of France
 Charles of France (born and died 1496), son of Charles VIII of France
 Charles II de Valois, Duke of Orléans (1522–1545), son of Francis I of France
 Charles de Valois, Duke of Angoulême (1573–1650), illegitimate son of Charles IX of France
 Charles, Duke of Berry (1686–1714), grandson of Louis XIV of France
 Charles Ferdinand, Duke of Berry (1778–1820), son of Charles X of France